Sinner or a Saint is the first studio album by Armenian American singer-songwriter Tamar Kaprelian, it was released on August 24, 2010.

Promotion
The first single "New Day" was available for download on iTunes on May 29, 2009. Then it was featured on the mid-season 5 finale of MTV's series "The Hills". On May 7, 2010 the music video was released via Vevo.

"Delicate Soul" was available for download on iTunes on August 25, 2009, it was released as a promotional single only.

Tamar Kaprelian also made a video for the song "Purified" it was premiered on her YouTube account and was just released as a promotional video single.

Track listing

References

2010 debut albums
Interscope Records albums
Tamar Kaprelian albums
Albums produced by Ryan Tedder